The Hicks Building is a building in the city of Sheffield, South Yorkshire, England, part of the University of Sheffield. It is named in honour after William Mitchinson Hicks. It was completed in 1962 with an additional lower section joined by a bridge constructed immediately afterwards. but was reclad in 2005.

The building houses the departments of Physics and Astronomy, the Chemistry and Physics Workshop (formally known as the Central Mechanical Workshops) and the School of Mathematics and Statistics, which comprises the departments of Probability and Statistics, Applied Mathematics and Pure Mathematics.

References

External links 
University of Sheffield
Department of Physics and Astronomy, University of Sheffield
Chemistry and Physics Workshop, University of Sheffield
School of Mathematics and Statistics, University of Sheffield

Sheffield University buildings and structures